Qazi Abu Yusuf is a Bangladeshi politician and physician of Faridpur District, who was a member of parliament for the then Faridpur-6 and Faridpur-5 constituencies.

Early life 
Yusuf was born in Bhanga Upazila, Faridpur District. His nephew is Kazi Zafarullah, a former MP from Faridpur-5 constituency who is a member of the Awami League.

Career 
Yusuf is a physician. He was elected a member of parliament from the then Faridpur-6 constituency as an independent candidate in the second parliamentary elections of 1989. He later joined the Awami League and was elected a member of parliament from the then Faridpur-5 constituency as a candidate of the Awami League in the 5th Parliamentary Elections of 1991 and the 7th Parliamentary Elections of 12 June 1996.

References 

7th Jatiya Sangsad members
5th Jatiya Sangsad members
2nd Jatiya Sangsad members
Awami League politicians
Year of birth missing (living people)
Living people
People from Faridpur District